The Football Federation Tasmania 2017 season was the fifth season under the new competition format in Tasmania.  The competition consists of three major divisions across the State of Tasmania,  created from the teams in the previous structure. The overall premier for the new structure qualified for the National Premier Leagues finals series, competing with the other state federation champions in a final knock-out tournament to decide the National Premier Leagues Champion for 2017.

Men's competitions

2017 NPL Tasmania

The 2017 NPL Tasmania season was played as a triple round-robin over 21 rounds, from 10 March to 19 August.

League Cup
A separate end of season finals series for the League Cup was again held using the same format as the previous year, which included the top six teams from the NPL Tasmania as well as the premiers from the Northern Championship and Southern Championship.

2017 Tasmanian Championships

2017 Northern Championship

The 2017 Northern Championship is the fourth edition of the Northern Championship as the second level domestic association football competition in Tasmania (third level overall in Australia). The league will consist of 8 teams, playing 21 matches.

2017 Southern Championship

The 2017 Southern Championship was the fourth edition of the Southern Championship as the second level domestic association football competition in Tasmania (third level overall in Australia). The league will consist of 9 teams, playing 16 matches.

Women's competitions

2017 Women's Super League

The 2017 Women's Super League season was the second edition of the statewide Tasmanian women's association football league. The league was played as a triple round-robin over 21 rounds.

Cup Competitions

The Milan Lakoseljac Cup competition also served as the Tasmanian Preliminary Rounds for the 2017 FFA Cup. Olympia entered at the Round of 32, where they were eliminated.

References

Football Federation Tasmania
Football Federation Tasmania seasons